Nutt is an English surname.

List of people surnamed Nutt
Alfred Nutt (1856–1910), British publisher
Alfred Young Nutt (1847–1924), English architect and artist
Commodore Nutt (1844–1881), American dwarf who worked for P. T. Barnum
Danny Nutt, American football coach
David Nutt; several people including
David Nutt, British scientist
David Nutt, English publisher
David H. Nutt, American lawyer and philanthropist
Dennis Nutt, American basketball player
Dickey Nutt, American basketball coach
Edwin C. Nutt (1868–1933), American farmer and politician
Eliza Hall Nutt, American philanthropist and schoolteacher
Emma Nutt, first female telephone switchboard operator
Gordon Nutt (born 1932), English footballer
Grady Nutt, American writer
Houston Nutt, American football coach
Jim Nutt, American artist
John Nutt; several people including
John Nutt, English pirate
John Nutt (politician), English MP
John Nutt (printer), English printer
Levi G. Nutt (1866–1938), American Treasury Department agent
 Mart Nutt (1962–2019), Estonian politician and historian
Roy Nutt, American businessman
Samantha Nutt, Canadian co-founder of War Child Canada
William Nutt (1836–1909), American Civil War colonel

See also
 Nut (disambiguation)
 Nutt. taxonomic author abbreviation of Thomas Nuttall (1786–1859), English botanist
 Nutt, New Mexico

English-language surnames